The 2018 24H Proto Series powered by Hankook was the second season of the 24H Proto Series. Creventic was the organiser and promoter of the series. The races were contested with Le Mans Prototype and Group CN cars, as well as some special prototypes.

Calendar

Entry List

Race results
Bold indicates overall winner.

See also
24H Series
2018 24H GT Series
2018 24H TCE Series
2018 Dubai 24 Hour

Notes

References

External links

2018 in motorsport
2018 in 24H Series